The 2009–10 ISU Grand Prix of Figure Skating was a series of senior-level international figure skating competitions in the 2009–10 season. The six invitational events took place in the fall of 2009, building to the Grand Prix Final. Skaters competed in the disciplines of men's singles, ladies singles, pair skating, and ice dancing on the senior level. At each event, skaters earned points based on their placement and the top six in each discipline at the end of the series qualified for the 2009–10 Grand Prix of Figure Skating Final, held in Tokyo, Japan.

The Grand Prix series set the stage for the 2010 European Figure Skating Championships, the 2010 Four Continents Figure Skating Championships, the 2009 World Figure Skating Championships, and the 2010 Winter Olympics, as well as each country's national championships. The Grand Prix series began on October 15, 2009, and ended on December 6, 2009.

The Grand Prix was organized by the International Skating Union. Skaters competed for prize money and for a chance to compete in the Grand Prix Final. The corresponding series for Junior-level skaters was the 2009–10 ISU Junior Grand Prix.

Qualifying
Skaters who reached the age of 14 by July 1, 2009, were eligible to compete on the senior Grand Prix circuit. The top six skaters/teams from the 2009 World Figure Skating Championships were seeded and were guaranteed two events. Skaters/teams who placed 7th through 12th will also given two events, though they were not considered seeded.

Skaters and teams who were ranked in the top 24 in the world at the end of the 2008-2009 season and those who had an ISU personal best in the top-24 on the season's best list for the 2008–09 season were also guaranteed one event.

Skaters/teams who medaled at the 2008–09 JGP Final or the 2009 World Junior Figure Skating Championships were guaranteed one event. Skaters who medaled at both the Junior Grand Prix Final and the World Junior Championships were guaranteed only one event.

The host country was allowed to send three skaters/teams of their choosing from their country in each discipline.

The spots remaining were filled from the top 75 skaters/teams in the 2008–09 season's best list. Skaters could not be given a Grand Prix invitation without having been on the season's best list, with the following exceptions:
 The host country could select any three of their own skaters for an invitation.
 Pairs and dance teams who had in either the 2007-08 or 2008–09 season qualified for Grand Prix spots by World Championships placement or had held a world ranking or season's best ranking in the top 24 with a previous partner could be considered for an alternate spot with their new partner.
 Skaters and teams who had previously been seeded (1st through 6th at the World Championships) and had not competed in prior seasons either through injury or no fault of their own could be considered for one or two Grand Prix assignments if they chose to return to competitive skating.

Assignments and withdrawals 
Sasha Cohen withdrew from the Trophée Eric Bompard due to tendinitis in her right calf. She also withdrew from Skate America and was replaced by Emily Hughes. Kimmie Meissner withdrew from the Rostelecom Cup and NHK Trophy due to a right knee injury.

Schedule

Medal summary

Grand Prix Final qualification points 
After the final event, the 2009 Skate Canada International, the six skaters/teams with the most points advanced to the Grand Prix Final. The point system was as follows:

There were 7 tie-breakers in cases of a tie in overall points:
Highest placement at an event. If a skater placed 1st and 3rd, the tiebreaker is the 1st place, and that beats a skater who placed 2nd in both events.
Highest combined total scores in both events. If a skater earned 200 points at one event and 250 at a second, that skater would win in the second tie-break over a skater who earned 200 points at one event and 150 at another.
Participated in two events.
Highest combined scores in the free skating/free dancing portion of both events.
Highest individual score in the free skating/free dancing portion from one event.
Highest combined scores in the short program/original dance of both events.
Highest number of total participants at the events.

If there is still a tie, the tie is considered unbreakable and the tied skaters all qualify for the Grand Prix Final.

Final standings
Skaters in bold qualified for the Grand Prix Final.

Prize money
The total prize money was $180,000 per individual event in the series and $272,000 for the Final. All amounts were in U.S. dollars. Pairs and dance teams split the money. The breakdown was as follows:

References

 2009-2010 ISU Grand Prix of Figure Skating
 
 
 
 
 
 
 
 
 
 
 
 
 
 
 
 ISU Grand Prix of Figure Skating 2009/2010: Men's Standings
 ISU Grand Prix of Figure Skating 2009/2010: Ladies Standings
 ISU Grand Prix of Figure Skating 2009/2010: Pairs Standings
 ISU Grand Prix of Figure Skating 2009/2010: Ice Dance Standings

External links
 2008-2009 Season's Best Scores: Men's singles
 2008-2009 Season's Best Scores: Ladies singles
 2008-2009 Season's Best Scores: Pair skating
 2008-2009 Season's Best Scores: Ice Dancing

Isu Grand Prix Of Figure Skating, 2009-10
ISU Grand Prix of Figure Skating